XLNT is a scripting language for Windows platforms based on the DCL language for OpenVMS systems.

Overview
Its proprietary implementation has been maintained by its originator, Advanced Systems Concepts, Inc., since 1997.  The implementation contains the XLNT executable, a Windows Scripting Host engine, and an integrated development environment.  It can also be used in CGI mode.  It is one of the handful of Windows-VMS emulation and interoperability tools, the others being PC-DCL and Accelr8 DCL Lite, both console mode interpreters which can run in an automated (scripting) mode. An older programme of this type, VCL, is used for VMS functionality under MS-DOS, PC DOS, OS/2, and Unix variants.  VCL can be run under later Windows versions which provide for 16-bit DOS programmes to be run, e.g. Windows NT via its Win16/DOS environmental subsystem or the program compatibility option in Windows XP et seq.

References

External links
 XLNT - Advanced Scripting

Scripting languages